WOGI (104.3 FM) is a radio station  broadcasting a Froggy branded Country music format. Licensed in the Pittsburgh suburb of Moon Township, Pennsylvania, United States, the station serves the Pittsburgh Media Market.  The station is currently owned by Forever Media, LLC and simulcasts on WOGG and WOGH.

History

WOGI signed on the air April 15, 1959 as WOHI-FM, the FM sister station of WOHI, both owned by East Liverpool Broadcasting Company.
WOHI and WOHI-FM were sold to Constrander Corporation, owned by Joseph D. Coons for $175,000 on December 20, 1960.
The acquisition of the stations took effect January 27, 1961.

WOHI-FM changed callsigns to WRTS in June 1967,
and in November 1971, Coons sold both WOHI and WRTS to Frank Mangano for $290,493.  However, the name of the company remained the same under the new owner.
WRTS changed callsigns once again to WELA in May 1974.  In the mid-1970s, WELA was an easy listening format.
By 1981, the easy listening format was dropped in favor of a C&W format.  By the late 1990s, the station had a classic hits format dubbed "Classic Hits 104".

Keymarket purchased both WOHI and WELA in 2000. 
 The new owner changed the callsign to WOGF on July 7, 2000, and adopted a country music format with the "Froggy" moniker; a format which continues today.  WOGF recently changed its city of license to Moon Township, PA from East Liverpool, Ohio.  The tower location remains in Beaver County, PA.  WOGF assumed the callsign WOGI in 2009, a callsign that was previously used on 98.3, which is a station in Pittsburgh, PA that Keymarket sold to EMF in 2009.  The new callsign on 98.3 is WPKV.

WOGI was partially simulcasted on WOGG in Oliver, Pennsylvania for many years.  The two stations had separate morning shows but were simulated throughout the day.  In July 2020,  the stations combined into a full simulcast are known as Froggy 104.3 and Froggy 94.9.

Currently, the station's weekday air staff consists of Mornings with Frogman Frank from 5-10AM, Katie Green Middays from 10AM-2PM, and Program Director Danger is on Afternoos 2-7PM.

References

External links

 https://radioinsight.com/headlines/189898/wogg-wogi-combine-into-simulcast/

OGF
Radio stations established in 1959
1959 establishments in Pennsylvania
Country radio stations in the United States